The following is a list of Lutheran bishops of Iceland.

List

See also
List of Skálholt bishops
List of Hólar bishops

External links
Official website 

History of Christianity in Iceland